Hillcrest School District  is a school district based in Strawberry, Arkansas, United States. The district encompasses  of land in Lawrence, Independence, and Sharp counties, and serves portions of Strawberry, Lynn, Smithville, Poughkeepsie, and Saffell.

History
On July 1, 2004, the district formed as a result of the merger of the River Valley School District with the Lynn School District. On July 1, 2010, the Twin Rivers School District was dissolved. A portion of the district was given to the Hillcrest district.

Schools 
Hillcrest School District supports more than 450 students with more than 80 faculty and staff for its two schools:
 Hillcrest Elementary School, located in Lynn and serving prekindergarten through grade 6.
 Hillcrest High School, located in Strawberry and serving grades 7 through 12.

References

Further reading
  (Download) - Boundaries of the predecessor districts
  (Download) - Boundaries of the predecessor districts
 AGENDA STATE BOARD OF EDUCATION May 10, 2010." Arkansas Board of Education. On PDF p. 89/172 there is a map showing the reallocation of Twin Rivers territory to the successor school districts in 2010. This map was prepared by GIS Program Manager Learon Dalby and released on April 5, 2010.

External links
 

Education in Independence County, Arkansas
Education in Lawrence County, Arkansas
Education in Sharp County, Arkansas
School districts in Arkansas
2004 establishments in Arkansas
School districts established in 2004